Valea Iașului is a commune in Argeș County, Muntenia, Romania. It is composed of nine villages: Bădila, Bărbălătești, Borovinești, Cerbureni, Mustățești, Ruginoasa, Ungureni, Valea Iașului and Valea Uleiului.

Natives
 Anghel Andreescu

References

Communes in Argeș County
Localities in Muntenia